Gabriel Escarrer Julià (born February 1935) is a Spanish billionaire businessman, and the founder and chairman of Meliá Hotels International.

He has six children, and lives on Mallorca, Spain.

His son Gabriel Escarrer Jaume is the vice-chairman and CEO.

References

1935 births
Living people
Spanish billionaires
20th-century Spanish businesspeople
21st-century Spanish businesspeople